= Soori Mansion =

Soori Mansion خانه سوری
- House
- Iran: Iran
- Kermanshah: Kermanshah
- Time zone: UTC+3:30 (IRST)
  - Summer (DST): UTC+4:30 (IRDT)

Soori Mansion. It is located in Iran’s western city of Kermanshah at 127 Fasihi lane, off Gomrok street. It was built in Qajar era.

On 13 March 2007 this ancient piece was recorded as one of Iran’s National Heritage under the number 18126. Soori Mansion is now used as a traditional restaurant.

== The building ==
This house belonged to Iranian national Jaafar Soori who, in 1973, offered it to Cultural Heritage, Handicrafts and Tourism Organization of Iran. The house is built on brick and clay. The ceiling is built by wooden and a few metal logs. The two storey historical Soori mansion is decorated with bricks. The inner house is linked to an internal yard by a porch and then by a hallway to the outside yard.

== See also ==
- Cultural Heritage, Handicrafts and Tourism Organization of Iran
